Atelestidae is a family of flies in the superfamily Empidoidea. The four genera were placed in a separate family in 1983; they were formerly either in Platypezidae (which are not even particularly closely related) or considered incertae sedis. While they are doubtless the most basal of the living Empidoidea, the monophyly of the family is not fully proven. The genus Nemedina seems to represent a most ancient lineage among the entire superfamily, while Meghyperus is probably not monophyletic in its present delimitation, and it is liable to be split up eventually, with some species being placed elsewhere. In 2010, the genus Alavesia, previously only known from Cretaceous fossils, was found alive in Namibia, subsequent species were also described from Brazil.

Atelestidae has been shown to form the sister group to the remaining members of the Empidoidea superfamily. Subfamilies include Atelestinae and Nemedininae.

Description

Atelestidae are small (2–3 mm) greyish-dusted flies. They are quite similar to Empididae and Ragadidae as all three families have a symmetrical male terminalia without rotation, and the origin of vein Rs (radial sector) is at a distance from humeral crossvein (h) as long or longer than length of h. However, it is distinguished from Ragadidae by a costa ending at or near the first and second medial vein (M1+2), and from Empididae by having the prosternum separated from proepisternum.

They have a disjunct distribution, being found in both the Holarctic and southern Neotropical regions (Chile).

Systematics

Based on the most recent phylogenetic studies, the relationship between Atelestidae and other members of Empidoidea is as follows. The placement of Atelestidae is emphasized in bold formatting.

Genera 

 Subfamily Atelestinae Hennig 1970
Acarteroptera Collin, 1933 Chile, Recent
Alavesia Waters & Arillo, 1999 Spanish amber, Albian, Burmese amber, Cenomanian Namibia, Brazil, Recent
†Atelestites Grimaldi & Cumming, 1999 Lebanese amber, Barremian
Atelestus Walker, 1837 Palearctic, Recent
 †Dianafranksia Coram et al., 2000 Lulworth Formation, United Kingdom, Berriasian
 †Kurnubempis Kaddumi, 2007 Jordanian amber, Albian
 Meghyperus Loew, 1850 Palearctic, Nearctic, Recent
 Subfamily Nemedininae Sinclair & Cumming, 2006
 †Cretodromia Grimaldi & Cumming, 1999 Canadian amber, Campanian
Nemedina Chandler, 1981 Baltic amber, Eocene, Palearctic, Recent
 †Nemedromia Grimaldi & Cumming, 1999 New Jersey amber, Turonian Canadian amber, Campanian 
 †Neoturonius Grimaldi & Cumming, 1999 New Jersey amber, Turonian
 †Phaetempis Grimaldi & Cumming, 1999 Lebanese amber, Barremian
 †Prolatomyia Grimaldi & Cumming, 1999 Canadian amber, Campanian

Footnotes

References
 Chvála, M. (1983): The Empidoidea (Diptera) of Fennoscandia and Denmark. II. General Part. The families Hybotidae, Atelestidae and Microphoridae. Fauna Entomologica Scandinavica 12: 1–279.
 Moulton, J. K. & Wiegmann, B. M. (2007): The phylogenetic relationships of flies in the superfamily Empidoidea (Insecta: Diptera). Molecular Phylogenetics and Evolution 43(3): 701-713.   (HTML abstract)
 Tree of Life Web Project (ToL) (2007): Atelestidae. Version of 2007-NOV-29. Retrieved 2008-JUL-30.
 Wahlberg, E. & Johanson, K.A. (2018): Molecular phylogenetics reveals novel relationships within Empidoidea (Diptera). Systematic Entomology 43(4): 619–636.

External links

Dipterists Forum
Diptera.info Images.

Empidoidea
Diptera of South America
Brachycera families